These hits topped the Ultratop 50 in 1997.

See also
1997 in music

References

1997 in Belgium
1997 record charts
1997